A warm front is a density discontinuity located at the leading edge of a homogeneous warm air mass, and is typically located on the equator-facing edge of an isotherm gradient. Warm fronts lie within broader troughs of low pressure than cold fronts, and move more slowly than the cold fronts which usually follow because cold air is denser and less easy to remove from the Earth's surface.  This also forces temperature differences across warm fronts to be broader in scale.  
Clouds ahead of the warm front are mostly stratiform, and rainfall defiantly increases as the front approaches.  Fog can also occur preceding a warm frontal passage. Clearing and warming is usually rapid after frontal passage.  If the warm air mass is unstable, thunderstorms may be embedded among the stratiform clouds ahead of the front, and after frontal passage thundershowers may continue.  On weather maps, the surface location of a warm front is marked with a red line of semicircles pointing in the direction of travel.

Development
               
Air masses are large bodies of air with similar properties of temperature and humidity that form over source regions.  The warm air mass behind a warm front is not only warmer, but often (but not always) also higher in humidity than the colder air preceding it. Because of a warm air mass’s higher temperature and thus lesser density, mixing between the two air masses is unlikely. Being light, the warm air mass is unable to displace the cooler air mass and instead is forced upward along the upper boundary of the colder air in a process known as overrunning. The boundary between the two air masses has a gradual slope of 1:200 and lifting is slow but persistent.

As the air mass rises into regions of lower pressure, it expands and cools. As it cools, any water vapor that is present will condense and form extensive cloud cover. The first clouds that indicate an approaching warm front tend to be mostly high cirrus at first, changing to cirrostratus as the front approaches. However, if cirrocumulus also appears, there is greater airmass instability approaching ahead of the front. When these high clouds progressively invade the sky and the barometric pressure begins to fall, precipitation associated with the disturbance is likely about 6 to 8 hours away. A thickening and lowering of these high clouds into middle-stage altostratus or altocumulus is a good sign the warm front or low has moved closer and precipitation may begin within less than six hours. If unstable altocumulus  castellanus accompanies or takes the place of the main altostratus layer, cumulus congestus or cumulonimbus producing showers or thunderstorms may follow. Low stratus and stratocumulus commonly form underneath the main precipitating clouds.

A warm front is also defined as the transition zone where a warmer air mass is replacing a cooler air mass. Warm fronts generally move from southwest to northeast.  If the warmer air originates over the ocean, it is not only warmer but also more moist than the air ahead of it.

Characteristics
If the air mass is relatively stable, rainfall will increase until the front reaches the location, at which time the clouds can extend all the way to the earth’s surface as fog.  Once the front passes, the location experiences some warming and clearing.  If the air mass is unstable, thunderstorms may precede and follow the front and temperature changes will be larger.

In the northern hemisphere, a warm front causes a shift of wind blowing from southeast to southwest, and in the southern hemisphere a shift from winds blowing from northeast to northwest. Common characteristics associated with warm fronts include:

Warm sector
The warm sector is a near-surface air mass in between the warm front and the cold front, on the equatorward side of an extratropical cyclone. With its warm and humid characteristics, this air is susceptive to convective instability and can sustain thunderstorms, especially if lifted by the advancing cold front.

Depiction

On weather maps, the surface location of a warm front is marked with a red line of half circles pointing in the direction of the front. On colored weather maps, warm fronts are illustrated with a solid red line.

See also
 Cold front
 Occluded front
 Pseudo-warm front
 Weather front

References

External links
Warm Front: transition zone from cold air to warm air
Warm Fronts
 

Weather fronts